Frances Bronet is a Canadian architect and academic administrator, currently serving as president of the Pratt Institute in Brooklyn, New York.

Education 
Bronet holds three undergraduate degrees from McGill University, including a Bachelor of Science in Architecture (1977) and professional Bachelor of Architecture (1978) from the McGill School of Architecture as well as a degree in civil engineering. She also completed a management diploma program. Bronet later earned an Master of Science in Architectural Design from Columbia University. She is a member of Ordre des architectes du Québec.

Career 
Bronet began her academic career as a faculty member at the Rensselaer Polytechnic Institute in 1985. Previously, she served as acting provost at the University of Oregon. She also served Dean of the University of Oregon College of Design from 2005 to 2014. Bronet later served as senior vice president and provost at Illinois Institute of Technology. On January 2, 2018, Bronet was named the 12th president of the Pratt Institute.

References 

Canadian women architects
Pratt Institute faculty
Year of birth missing (living people)
Living people
McGill School of Architecture alumni